Phaenicophaeus is a genus of 6 species of cuckoos in the family Cuculidae.

References

External links

Bird genera
Phaenicophaeus